Christopher Miles Bertram King  (born November 1948) is a British philatelist who in 2014 was elected to the Roll of Distinguished Philatelists. King is a specialist in the philately of Scandinavia, particularly Schleswig.

King is keeper of the Roll of Distinguished Philatelists and was President of the Royal Philatelic Society London in 2014.

References

1948 births
Living people
British philatelists
Presidents of the Royal Philatelic Society London
Signatories to the Roll of Distinguished Philatelists